Dhirendra Chand is a Nepalese cricketer who has played for the Nepal national cricket team since 2005.

He represents the Region no. 6 Baitadi of the National League.

Biography 

Born in Nepal, Dhirendra Chand made his début for Nepal in 2005 when he played in the repêchage tournament of the 2005 ICC Trophy, in which Nepal finished third after beating Qatar in a play-off. He also played ACC Fast Track Nations matches against Singapore, Malaysia, the UAE and Hong Kong that year. The games against the UAE and Hong Kong also counted towards the 2005 ICC Intercontinental Cup and are his only first-class matches to date.

He most recently represented his country in August 2006 when he toured Pakistan with Nepal and played in the ACC Trophy in Malaysia.

Man of the match awards
The following list illustrates all the matches in which Chand has been awarded Man of the Match while representing Nepal in international tournaments/series.

References 

Living people
Nepalese cricketers
Year of birth missing (living people)